Yoav Avni (Hebrew: יואב אבני; born November 24, 1969) is a prominent Israeli author and translator. His books HaHamishit Shel Chong Levi (Chong Levi's Fifth) and Herzl Amar (Herzl Said) have earned him national recognition and both received the Geffen Award in 2010 and 2012 respectively.

Biography
Yoav Avni was born November 24, 1969, in Givatayim, Israel. After finishing highschool, Avni joined the Israeli Defence Forces where he served in the Navy and was later re-stationed in the Artillery Corps where he served as a lieutenant. After his military service, he travelled to the Far East.
Avni holds a bachelor's degree in economics & management from Tel Aviv University and a master's degree in communications from Clark University.
He currently resides in Tel-Aviv.

Books 
 Eize Metumtamim HaAmerikaim (Those Strange Americans) (1995) – 
His first book published in 1995. Excerpts were featured in the Israeli publication "Moznayim" and in various American Magazines.
A digital version was publish in 2013.

 Shlosha Dvarim l'Yi Boded (Three Things for a Desert Island) (2006) – 
Avni's second publication and his first novel which became a best-seller. A modern-day tale about a high-tech employee who goes on a business trip to "Go-Ten-Gent" a fictitious island in the Indian Ocean. Nominated for a Geffen Award for best original book in 2007.

 HaHamishit Shel Chong Levi (Chong Levi's Fifth) (2009) – 
His third book. Tells the story of a son to a Chinese foreign worker mother and a soccer fan father. The book won the Geffen Award for best original book in 2010.

 Herzl Amar (Herzl Said) (2011) – 
Avni's fourth book. A fictional premise where the "Uganda Scheme" was carried out and the state of Israel was established in East Africa. Won the Geffen Award for best original book in the science fiction and fantasy category in 2012.

 Lahatzot Nahar Paamyim (To Cross a River Twice) (2016) – 
Avni's fifth book. The novel takes place on an especially rainy winter when a mythological creature emerges from the Yarkon River.

Hebrew translations
In 2010, Avni translated Charles Kingsley's book, The Water Babies.

In 2013, his renewed translation for Richard Adams' book Watership Down was published and in 2014 he translated Gerald Durrell's My Family and Other Animals.

In 2016, he published a renewed translation for Mary Norton's The Borrowers.

References

External links

 Yoav Avni – Official Website 
 Yoav Avni – Wordpress Blog 
 לא מחויב המציאות Yoav Avni on Ynet 
 חינני פלוס: יואב אבני לא מעמיק Yoav Avni on nrg Maariv 
 

1969 births
People from Givatayim
Israeli novelists
Israeli speculative fiction writers
Clark University alumni
Modern Hebrew writers
20th-century novelists
21st-century novelists
Israeli translators
Living people